Zelet is a village in Ashrestaq Rural District, Yaneh Sar District, Behshahr County, Mazandaran Province, Iran. At the 2006 census, its population was 192, in 45 families.

References 

Populated places in Behshahr County